Justin Craig Scoggins (born May 2, 1992) is an American mixed martial artist and former full-contact kickboxer currently competing in the Rizin Fighting Federation. A professional mixed martial artist since 2010, Scoggins has previously competed in the Ultimate Fighting Championship.

Mixed martial arts career

Early career
Scoggins began training in karate at the age of three, later transitioning to wrestling and kickboxing. Aspiring to compete for the UFC, Scoggins opted to drop out of high school and focus solely on honing his skills. He held an amateur MMA record of 6-0-1 before making his professional debut in February 2012, amassing an undefeated record of 7-0 prior to signing with the UFC.

Ultimate Fighting Championship

2013
In August 2013, the UFC announced they had signed Scoggins to a contract.  He was briefly linked to a bout with Dustin Ortiz at UFC Fight Night 27 before it was cancelled.

Scoggins eventually debuted on December 7, 2013 at UFC Fight Night 33 against Richie Vaculik.  Scoggins won the fight via TKO in the first round.

For his second fight, Scoggins replaced Darrell Montague against Will Campuzano on March 15, 2014 at UFC 171. Scoggins won the fight via unanimous decision.

2014 
For his third fight with the promotion, Scoggins faced Dustin Ortiz on July 6, 2014 at The Ultimate Fighter 19 Finale Scoggins suffered the first loss of his professional MMA career via split decision.

Scoggins next faced John Moraga at UFC Fight Night 50.  Scoggins lost the fight via submission in the second round.

2015

Scoggins faced Josh Sampo on May 23, 2015 at UFC 187.  Scoggins won the fight via unanimous decision.

Scoggins was expected to face Joby Sanchez on December 11, 2015 at The Ultimate Fighter 22 Finale. However, Scoggins pulled out of the fight in the week leading up to the event and was replaced by Geane Herrera.

2016 
Scoggins faced Ray Borg on February 6, 2016 at UFC Fight Night 82. Scoggins won the fight via unanimous decision.

Scoggins was expected to face Ben Nguyen on March 20, 2016 at UFC Fight Night 85. However, Scoggins pulled out of the fight in the week leading up to the event citing injury. As a result, Nguyen was pulled from the card entirely.

Scoggins was expected to face Ian McCall on July 30, 2016 at UFC 201. However, two days before the event, Scoggins announced that he was pulling out of the fight as he was not going to make the contracted weight. As a result, McCall was pulled from the card altogether. Scoggins will now compete at bantamweight full-time.

Scoggins next faced Pedro Munhoz in a bantamweight bout on November 19, 2016 at UFC Fight Night 100. He lost the bout by submission in the second round.

2017 
Scoggins faced Ulka Sasaki in a flyweight bout on June 17, 2017 at UFC Fight Night 111. Scoggins lost the fight via rear-naked choke in the second round.

Scoggins was expected to face Tim Elliott on December 16, 2017 at UFC on Fox 26. However on December 3, it was announced that Scoggins was pulled from the fight due to a spinal fracture injury.

2018 
Scoggins faced promotional newcomer Said Nurmagomedov on July 14, 2018 at UFC Fight Night 133. He lost the fight via controversial split decision. All 17 media outlets scored the fight for Scoggins.

On November 9, 2018, it was reported that Scoggins was released from the UFC.

Rizin FF
Scoggins faced Yuki Motoya in a 132lbs catchweight bout at Rizin 14 on December 31, 2018. He lost the bout via submission in the first round.

Scoggins was called on short notice to replace injured Ulka Sasaki, and was expected to face Kai Asakura at Rizin 15. Eventually Scoggins suffered a knee injury which led the bout scrapped from the fight card.

Scoggins stepped in on short notice to replace Erson Yamamoto against Kazuma Sone at Rizin 18 on August 18, 2019. He won the fight via unanimous decision.

Post Rizin
Scoggins was expected to face Keith Richardson at XMMA2 on July 30, 2021. The bout was scrapped when Richardson pulled out due to unknown reasons.

Scoggins made his first appearance after a 2 and a half year break at iKON FC 2 on March 18, 2022 against Eduardo Diez. He won the bout via unanimous decision.

Personal life
Justin was married to Hannah Scoggins, who also is a mixed martial artist.

Championships and achievements

Kickboxing
International Kickboxing Federation
2004 North American Classic Championship Tournament  (80.1-85 lbs.)

Mixed martial arts
Warfare Fighting Championships
Warfare FC Flyweight Championship (One time)
Two successful title defenses

Mixed martial arts record

|-
|Win
|align=center|13–6
|Eduardo Diez
|Decision (unanimous)
|iKON FC 2
|
|align=center|3
|align=center|5:00
|Miami, Florida, United States
|
|-
|Win
|align=center|12–6
|Kazuma Sone
|Decision (unanimous)
|Rizin 18
|
|align=center|3
|align=center|5:00
|Nagoya, Japan
|
|-
|Loss
| align=center| 11–6
|Yuki Motoya
|Submission (leg scissor choke)
|Rizin 14
|
|align=center|1
|align=center|3:27
|Saitama, Japan
|
|-
|Loss
|align=center|11–5
|Said Nurmagomedov
|Decision (split)
|UFC Fight Night: dos Santos vs. Ivanov 
|
|align=center|3
|align=center|5:00
|Boise, Idaho, United States
|
|-
|Loss
|align=center|11–4
|Ulka Sasaki
|Submission (rear-naked choke)
|UFC Fight Night: Holm vs. Correia
|
|align=center|2
|align=center|3:19
|Kallang, Singapore
|
|-
|Loss
|align=center|11–3
|Pedro Munhoz
|Submission (guillotine choke)
|UFC Fight Night: Bader vs. Nogueira 2
|
|align=center|2
|align=center|1:55
|São Paulo, Brazil
| 
|-
|Win
|align=center|11–2
|Ray Borg
|Decision (unanimous)
|UFC Fight Night: Hendricks vs. Thompson
|
|align=center|3
|align=center|5:00
|Las Vegas, Nevada, United States
|  
|-
|Win
|align=center|10–2
|Josh Sampo
|Decision (unanimous)
|UFC 187
|
|align=center|3
|align=center|5:00
|Las Vegas, Nevada, United States
|
|-
|Loss
|align=center|9–2
|John Moraga
|Submission (guillotine choke)
|UFC Fight Night: Jacare vs. Mousasi
|
|align=center|2
|align=center|0:47
|Mashantucket, Connecticut, United States
|
|-
|Loss
|align=center|9–1
|Dustin Ortiz
|Decision (split)
|The Ultimate Fighter: Team Edgar vs. Team Penn Finale
|
|align=center|3
|align=center|5:00
|Las Vegas, Nevada, United States
|
|-
|Win
|align=center|9–0
|Will Campuzano
|Decision (unanimous)
|UFC 171
|
|align=center|3
|align=center|5:00
|Dallas, Texas, United States
|
|-
|Win
|align=center|8–0
|Richie Vaculik
|TKO (punches)
|UFC Fight Night: Hunt vs. Bigfoot
|
|align=center|1
|align=center|4:43
|Brisbane, Australia
|
|-
|Win
|align=center|7–0
|Len Cook
|TKO (punches)
|Warfare 9: Apocalypse
|
|align=center|2
|align=center|0:18
|North Myrtle Beach, South Carolina, United States
|
|-
|Win
|align=center|6–0
|Chris Cain
|TKO (punches)
|Warfare 8: Armageddon
|
|align=center|1
|align=center|3:57
|North Myrtle Beach, South Carolina, United States
|
|-
|Win
|align=center|5–0
|Jacob Hebeisen	
|TKO (hook kick and punches)
|Warfare 7: Invasion
|
|align=center|5
|align=center|3:45
|North Myrtle Beach, South Carolina, United States
|
|-
|Win
|align=center|4–0
|Keith Hulin	
|TKO (knees and punches)
|Warfare 6: Friday Night Fights
|
|align=center|1
|align=center|1:00
|North Myrtle Beach, South Carolina, United States
|
|-
|Win
|align=center|3–0
|Casey Large	
|Submission (armbar)
|EC/Conflict MMA - Extreme Challenge 211
|
|align=center|1
|align=center|4:55
|Mount Pleasant, South Carolina, United States
|
|-
|Win
|align=center|2–0
|Timothy Wade
|Decision (unanimous)
|Quest for Glory Championship 1
|
|align=center|3
|align=center|5:00
|Greenville, South Carolina, United States
|
|-
|Win
|align=center|1–0
|Timm Kitts
|KO (head kick)
|Conflict MMA - Fight Night at the Point 4
|
|align=center|1
|align=center|0:23
|Mount Pleasant, South Carolina, United States
|

Bare knuckle record

|-
|Loss
|align=center|0–1
|Keith Richardson
|Decision (unanimous)
|BKFC 35
|
|align=center|5
|align=center|2:00 
|Myrtle Beach, South Carolina, United States
|
|-

See also
 List of current UFC fighters
 List of male mixed martial artists

References

External links

Official UFC Profile

1992 births
Living people
American male mixed martial artists
Flyweight mixed martial artists
American male karateka
Sportspeople from Greenville, South Carolina
Mixed martial artists from South Carolina
Mixed martial artists utilizing karate
Mixed martial artists utilizing American Kenpo
Mixed martial artists utilizing wrestling
Mixed martial artists utilizing Brazilian jiu-jitsu
Bantamweight mixed martial artists
Ultimate Fighting Championship male fighters
American male kickboxers
American practitioners of Brazilian jiu-jitsu